Maxim Shlyakin is a Russian trampoline gymnast competing in tumbling and tumbling team events. In 2018, he won the gold medal in the tumbling team event at the European Trampoline Championships in Baku, Azerbaijan. He won the silver medal in this event at the 2019 Trampoline World Championships in Tokyo, Japan.

In 2017, he won the bronze medal in the men's tumbling event at the World Games held in Wrocław, Poland.

References

External links 
 

Living people
Year of birth missing (living people)
Place of birth missing (living people)
Russian male trampolinists
Medalists at the Trampoline Gymnastics World Championships
Competitors at the 2017 World Games
World Games bronze medalists